Can Bonastre is a traditional winery in Masquefa village, Anoia, Spain, founded in 1548 and located in the Can Bonastre de Santa Magdalena estate.
 According to tradition it is Masquefa's oldest farm. 

Its area is about 100 hectares, of which 50 are vineyards of different varieties: chardonnay, sauvignon blanc, macabeo, riesling, pinot noir, merlot, cabernet sauvignon, tempranillo, cabernet franc, etc.

See also 
List of oldest companies

References

External links 
Homepage
Location on Google Maps

Wineries of Spain
Hotels in Spain
Companies established in the 16th century
16th-century establishments in Spain
Food and drink companies established in the 16th century